Anthony Francis Martin (born 10 June 1964) is a New Zealand comedian, writer and actor, who has had a successful TV, radio, stand-up and film career in Australia.

Career

1980s
A former stand-up comedian and commercial voice-over-man, Tony Martin moved to Brisbane, Australia, from New Zealand when he was 21 to work as a radio copywriter. Having worked in radio and amateur theatre back in NZ, Martin approached the ABCTV's The D-Generation in 1986 to work as a writer only to be told that filming on the first series had been completed. In the interim, he was invited to work as a researcher on ABC-TV's The Gillies Republic which was the follow-up to the highly successful political satire The Gillies Report (1984–85). The show was not a success but Martin learnt a considerable amount from the production's mistakes, and made his Australian TV debut as 'Man in Bad Suit' in episode 4. He was also able to observe the production of the last few episodes of the 1986 ABC-TV live sketch-comedy show While You're Down There which starred Richard Stubbs and Glenn Robbins and it was on the set that he met D-Gen member Tom Gleisner. Following that, Martin was employed for a short period as a puppeteer on the ABC-TV political satire Rubbery Figures which featured rubber puppet-caricatures of famous politicians created by artist Peter Nicholson (Martin also did the voice of Joh Bjelke-Petersen). Martin was on the verge of heading back home to New Zealand when he was invited to be a writer for the second series of The D-Generation in 1987. He also made short appearances on the show, and featured on the 1989 spin-off album, The Satanic Sketches. Martin began to take on a more prominent role when the D-Generation produced four comedy specials for Network Seven in 1988–89, including doing one of the voices for 'DeGenocide' where clips of the old Australian TV crime series Homicide were dubbed over with funny lines. Martin became a bona fide D-Gen member when he began writing and performing on the troupe's "Breakfast Show" on Triple M Melbourne radio (1987–1992), which led to the 1990 compilation album The Breakfast Tapes. On air, Martin was frequently referred to by the other D-Gen members as "The Fat Man." Along with Rob Sitch, Martin left the radio show a little earlier than the other members to prepare The D-Gen's next venture for ABC TV (although he did make time to host Bulltwang, a Sunday Night radio show on Triple M with Mick Molloy, which ran for sixteen weeks in 1990).

1990s
Instantly recognisable as the "tall skinny guy with glasses," Martin was one of the most valuable members of the D-Gen as a writer and performer on The Late Show (1992–1993). His co-introductions to almost every episode and "Street Interviews" segment highlighted his effective comedic partnership with Mick Molloy. Noted for his quick wit and passion for mimicry, Martin also appeared in countless Late Show sketches (including sleazy filmmaker Warren Perso in the classic sketch: The Last Australian Auteur), and provided the voices of Senior Sergeant Bargearse in the serial Bargearse (dubbed episodes of Bluey) and Governor Frontbottom and Judge Muttonchops in the serial The Olden Days (dubbed episodes of Rush). Martin compiled all three volumes of The Best Bits of The Late Show with Santo Cilauro and Wayne Marx, and also co-produced the "dangerously overstuffed" double DVD set, The Best Bits of The Late Show: Champagne Edition, which was released in 2001.

After The Late Show finished, Martin and Mick Molloy went on to develop and perform their top-rating national radio programme Martin/Molloy, which produced three ARIA award winning compilation albums: The Brown Album (1995), Poop Chute (1996) and Eat Your Peas (1998).

2000s
Martin made several guest appearances on Thank God You're Here, The Panel, The Mick Molloy Show (reprising his "Street Interview" skills), Kath & Kim (as Magda Szubanski's fiddle-playing boyfriend), and Welcher and Welcher. In 2004, Tony Martin and Shaun Micallef began work on a TV sketch comedy series for the ABC with the working title Mouse-Patrol but after they wrote enough material for the first three episodes, the project was cancelled by management, much to Martin's disappointment who commented in an interview in 2009 that the un-filmed scripts contained the best sketch stuff he had written for TV.

On 3 April 2006, Martin returned to the Austereo network to produce a nationally syndicated show with Ed Kavalee and Richard Marsland on Triple M named Get This. Although Get This was a ratings success and developed a dedicated legion of fans, on 16 October 2007 Triple M announced that the show would be axed, so the network could focus company attention and resources on new breakfast shows debuting across the country such as The Shebang in Sydney and a new, multimillion-dollar Melbourne-based show presented by Peter Helliar and Myf Warhurst, both of which were ironically also cancelled by Triple M over the next couple of years. Towards the end of the show's run, a gathering of about 170 devoted fans took place outside the Triple M studios in Melbourne on 5 November 2007 to protest against the cancellation of the program. The last episode was aired 23 November 2007.

Martin wrote an online column called "Scarcely Relevant" at The Scrivener's Fancy which was updated weekly 2009–2011. The website was placed on hiatus in June 2011 so Martin could concentrate on his latest TV project. The site was closed in November 2011. As of June 2012, the archived columns are available to download as an ebook.

Martin has directed episodes of ABC TV's The Librarians, and, since 2008, has co-hosted shifts on 3RRR with Tony Wilson as The Two Tones.

2010s
After a successful guest appearance on Sunday Arts (ABC-TV) in 2009 in which he interviewed US writer & lecturer Robert McKee, Martin commenced working on a new program called A Quiet Word With ... which began airing on ABC1 on 28 September 2010. Rather than being a conventional celebrity-interview show, the program featured Martin having relaxed and informal conversations with comedians and performers that he admired, and in some cases, had worked with during his own career. The first two episodes, featuring English comedian Bill Bailey and US actor and writer Carrie Fisher, were aired, respectively, in September and November 2010. The remaining ten episodes were screened weekly on ABC1 from 2 April 2011, beginning with British actor and comedian Alan Davies, and concluding on 4 June 2011 with British actor and writer Richard E Grant.

In February 2011, Martin appeared as one of the regulars on the radio-comedy program The Lonely Hearts Club which was broadcast weekly on ABC Radio National on Saturday nights from 10 pm to midnight. The show, delivered in a deadpan, straight fashion, featured an un-credited Martin appearing under the pseudonym of 39-year-old Duncan Jardine, one of Australia's most successful second-unit directors. The first episode was broadcast on 12 February 2011 and the eighth and final episode was heard on 2 April 2011.

In December 2010, the Nine Network announced that Martin would be reunited with his former co-host on Get This, Ed Kavalee, for an upcoming comedy show entitled The Joy of Sets. This comedy television series looking at the elements used to construct television shows, commenced screening on 20 September 2011 in the 9:00 pm Tuesday timeslot on Nine. The debut episode rated well but audience figures declined for the subsequent episodes, prompting Channel 9 to move the show to a later timeslot of 10.30pm midway through the series. The eighth and final episode aired on 8 November 2011.

In late 2012, Martin co-directed (with Wayne Hope) episodes of a new eight-part comedy series Upper Middle Bogan, filmed on location in Melbourne and which aired on ABC-TV in August 2013. The series was created and written by Hope and Robyn Butler of Gristmill Productions who also created The Librarians and Very Small Business. Martin later directed episodes of the second series of the show in 2014.

In 2013, Martin announced via Twitter that he was in the UK working as a co-writer on Ross Noble's new comedy-travelogue program Freewheeling which aired on the UK comedy channel Dave. Back home, Martin made a return to live comedy with his show The Yeti opening at the Melbourne Fringe Festival in September 2013. In 2015, Martin performed at the Melbourne Fringe with his show The Arse/Elbow Equation which he later performed at Brisbane Arts Theatre in early 2016.

Martin and writer & editor Sarina Rowell, in 2014, began writing a new sitcom Childproof about a young couple who decide not to have children. But after three years of pitching the idea, Martin and Rowell were unable to sell the project to any of the TV networks. Instead in September 2017, Martin and comedian Geraldine Quinn recorded the scripts as a live podcast at the Melbourne Fringe Festival and was later downloadable for free.

In May 2016, Martin joined the Breakfast show on Nova 100, initially as a temporary replacement for regular co-host Sam Pang, but he currently appears weekly as a guest co-host. Since 2017, Martin has also appeared as a regular co-host on Ed Kavalee's T.E.A.M Effort podcast. and has been a guest vocalist for Damian Cowell's Disco Machine, appearing on both the latter's self-titled 2015 album and their 2017 album Get Yer Dag On. Martin's first novel Deadly Kerfuffle was published by Affirm Press in October 2017. In May 2018, Martin & producer Matt Dower began releasing a new fortnightly comedy podcast Sizzletown which by mid-August had achieved over 160,000 downloads.

Movies
Martin played the part of "intrigued school child" in the 1977 movie Sleeping Dogs. Martin wrote, produced and directed the 2003 comedy movie Bad Eggs (in which he also made a cameo appearance as a game show host), and wrote and directed the unreleased 2007 mockumentary BoyTown Confidential. He has also played minor roles in several films (mostly those of former Late Show colleagues), including The Castle (1997), Tackle Happy (2000), Crackerjack (2002) and  BoyTown (2006). More recently, he has had roles in two films made by his former Get This co-host Ed Kavalee:  Scumbus (2012) and Border Protection Squad (2012).

Books
Martin's first book, Lolly Scramble, a collection of humorous autobiographical essays, was published in 2005.
Martin's second book, A Nest of Occasionals, was released in October 2009. The latter book, re-printed in a second edition in April 2011, was voted as the best work of Australian comedy in any medium in 2009 by the comedy review website Australian Tumbleweeds
A third book was released online in 2012, downloadable as an ebook on tonymartinthings.com, called Scarcely Relevant, a collection of Martin's columns from the now closed Scriveners Fancy website. Deadly Kerfuffle, Martin's first novel, was published in 2017.  Deadly Kerfuffle was shortlisted for the 2019 Russell Prize.

Personal life 
Martin grew up in the small New Zealand towns of Te Kuiti and Thames. For two years as a child, he lived on a boat for five months of the year as his father was a part-time amateur marlin fisherman. Since there was no TV, he would listen to radio programs like The Goon Show and try to copy the voices.

Martin married Annie Maver, a floor manager on The Panel and RocKwiz, who has worked as an assistant director in Australian movies and television productions. He met her when she was a floor manager on The D-Generation. They are now divorced.

In his spare time, Martin is currently on a venture to walk every street in Melbourne which he embarked upon in 2009. Nine News aired a story on his project in August 2017.

Filmography

Podcasts
 Tribute to Richard Marsland (Triple M Network) December 2008
 Summer Lovin' (Nova) 2010 – 2012
 I Love Green-Guide Letters (episodes 21 & 65) (iTunes & www.ilovegreenguideletters.com) April 2012 & March 2013
 The Little Dum Dum Club (episodes 131, 158 & 233) (www.dumdumclub.libsyn.com) March 2013, October 2013 & March 2015
 Dumbed down atheist (episode 36d) ( http://www.spreaker.com/user/4582839/dumbed_down_atheist_36d_melb_comedy_fest  & iTunes )
 Can You Take This Photo Please? (with Justin Hamilton)
 T.E.A.M Effort (Triple M Network) 2016- 2017. (iTunes)
 Chat10Looks3 (October 2017)- (www.chat10looks3.com)
 Childproof (2017)- (co-written with Sarina Rowell)
 SizzleTown (2018-)

Discography

Albums

Awards

ARIA Music Awards
The ARIA Music Awards is an annual awards ceremony that recognises excellence, innovation, and achievement across all genres of Australian music. Martin has been part of four winning ensembles, all in the category of ARIA Award for Best Comedy Release.

|-
|colspan=4|as part of The D-Generation
|- 
|  1990
| The Satanic Sketches
| rowspan="2"| ARIA Award for Best Comedy Release
| 
|-
|  1991
| The Breakfast Tapes (1988-90)
| 
|-
|colspan=4|as part of Martin/Molloy
|- 
|  1996
| The Brown Album
| rowspan="3"| ARIA Award for Best Comedy Release
| 
|-
|  1997
| Poop Chute
| 
|-
|  1999
| Eat Your Peas
| 
|-

Books
 Lolly Scramble (Pan Macmillan 2005)
 A Nest of Occasionals (Picador 2009)
 Scarcely Relevant (ebook 2012)
 Deadly Kerfuffle (Affirm Press 2017)

References

External links

 
 Tony Martin at Pan Macmillan
 Champagne Comedy: The Late Show fan site and forum.
 Tony Martin interview at Shaun Micallef's Online World Around Him
 Tony Martin's ebooks.

1964 births
Australian male film actors
Australian stand-up comedians
Living people
Logie Award winners
ARIA Award winners
New Zealand emigrants to Australia
People educated at Hamilton Boys' High School
People from Te Kūiti
Triple M presenters